Anomis planalis, the common cotton looper, is a moth of the family Erebidae. The species was first described by Charles Swinhoe in 1902. It is found in northern Australia.

The wingspan is about 28 mm. Adult forewing span c. 40 mm for females and 45 mm for males. The forewings are light yellow brown with weak watermark patterns running longitudinally across the wings. The hindwings are plain light yellow brown.

Larvae are a pest of various Malvaceae species, including Hibiscus cannabinus and Gossypium hirsutum, as well as okra, Abutilon species and tomato.

Gallery

References

Catocalinae
Moths of Australia
Moths described in 1902